Calliostoma tampaense is a species of sea snail, a marine gastropod mollusk in the family Calliostomatidae.

Description
The shell grows to a height of 24 mm. The shell has a straight conical form, broader than Calliostoma jujubinum (Gmelin, 1791).  The whorls are flat above, not prominent at the sutures or concave. The spiral riblets or stria are fewer, and all beaded. The color of the shell is light brown, clouded with darker, often marked with white on the periphery. The umbilicus has a larger perforation, and is bounded by a distinctly beaded rib.

Distribution
This species occurs in the Gulf of Mexico off Florida at a depth between 0 m and 11 m.

References

 Conrad, T. A. 1846. Descriptions of new species of fossil and Recent shells and corals. Proceedings of the Academy of Natural Sciences of Philadelphia 3: 19–27, pl. 1.
 Rosenberg, G., F. Moretzsohn, and E. F. García. 2009. Gastropoda (Mollusca) of the Gulf of Mexico, Pp. 579–699 in Felder, D.L. and D.K. Camp (eds.), Gulf of Mexico–Origins, Waters, and Biota. Biodiversity. Texas A&M Press, College Station, Texas.

External links
 

tampaense
Gastropods described in 1846